The Equestrian competition at the 2002 Central American and Caribbean Games was held in San Salvador, El Salvador.

Medal summary

Individual events

Team events

References

External links
Official Results

Equestrian at the Central American and Caribbean Games
2002 in equestrian
Equestrian sports in El Salvador